Karikari is a surname. Notable people with the surname include:

Godfred Karikari (born 1985), Ghanaian-born Hong Kong footballer
Kwame Karikari (born 1992), Ghanaian footballer
Kwaku Karikari (born 2002), Ghanaian footballer
Ohene Karikari (born 1954), Ghanaian sprinter
Richard Karikari (born 1979), Canadian football player